Gerrit Lagendijk (13 November 1941 – 11 August 2010) was a Dutch professional football player and agent.

Early and personal life
Lagendijk was born in Rotterdam and grew up in Ridderkerk.

Playing career
Lagendijk began his career with the youth team of Feyenoord. He later played senior football with ADO, De Volewijckers and PEC.

He spent the 1968 season in the North American Soccer League with the Vancouver Royals, scoring one goal in five appearances.

He finished his career with Hermes DVS.

Agent
After retiring as a player, Lagendijk initially worked in insurance and as an arbitrator for the VVCS football association.

Lagendijk worked as a football agent and represented a number of players, including Ronald Koeman, Erwin Koeman, Hans van Breukelen, Adri van Tiggelen, John Bosman and Ernie Brandts.

Death
Lagendijk died of a heart attack on 11 August 2010, at the age of 68.

References

1941 births
2010 deaths
Footballers from Ridderkerk
Dutch footballers
Dutch expatriate footballers
Feyenoord players
ADO Den Haag players
AVV De Volewijckers players
PEC Zwolle players
Vancouver Royals players
Hermes DVS players
North American Soccer League (1968–1984) players
Dutch expatriate sportspeople in Canada
Expatriate soccer players in Canada
Association football defenders
Dutch sports agents
Association football agents